A Story in White is the debut album by the Scottish band Aereogramme, released in 2001 on the Chemikal Underground label.

Track listing
 "The Question Is Complete" – 4:50
 "Post-Tour, Pre-Judgement" – 5:10
 "Egypt" – 3:19
 "Hatred" – 4:21
 "Zionist Timing" – 5:30
 "Sunday 3:52" – 4:56
 "Shouting for Joey" – 3:27
 "A Meaningful Existence" – 5:12
 "Descending" – 4:30
 "Will You Still Find Me?" – 4:12

References

Aereogramme albums
2001 debut albums
Chemikal Underground albums